Rocketbirds: Hardboiled Chicken is a platform adventure game created and developed by Ratloop for Microsoft Windows, PlayStation 3, and PlayStation Vita. OS X and Linux ports were later released in September 2013 as part of Humble Bundle, followed by the PlayStation 4 version in November 2020. A remake of the 2009 Flash game Rocketbirds: Revolution!, Hardboiled Chicken is a cinematic adventure game with full single and co-op campaigns and stereoscopic 3D support.

Gameplay
Rocketbirds: Hardboiled Chicken is a platforming game in which the player controls Hardboiled Chicken, an anthropomorphic rooster equipped with a jetpack and various weapons. The game is divided into 12 chapters across multiple stages, with most taking place in non-scrolling platform stages with multiple screens, and others taking place in aerial gunfights against flying enemies.

In regular stages, players can run, jump, grab ledges and shoot with gameplay similar to the likes of Oddworld and Rolling Thunder. The player unlocks many different weapons throughout the campaign, with which they have to dispatch enemies of different ranks. These consist of gun-wielding penguin soldiers, riot shield soldiers that use either clubs or swords, clones of Hardboiled Chicken that only wield standard pistols, penguins that use bazookas with homing missiles, and larger boss-type enemies with holographic shield barriers in front of them. Turrets and laser barriers can also be found during gameplay and deal the most damage against the player. Neither players, friendly characters nor enemies can fire anywhere other than straight in whichever direction they're facing, but are able to be juggled in-air with opposing fire, or punched away in a close enough range, though the latter doesn't seem to deal damage unless also followed with fire. Characters can also crouch, roll and hide in the background for cover and dodging attacks. In addition to using guns and grenades, Hardboiled can be equipped with Brain Bugs, which are small spider-like grenades that possess the minds of enemies upon detonation. Possessed enemy penguin soldiers can be manipulated into attacking their own, bypassing guards when not being hostile, and activating switches for objects like elevators.

The game balances brutal shootouts and puzzling elements, keeping the player alert. On occasion, the player will engage in 'Jetpaction' stages where Hardboiled must infiltrate and destroy zeppelins with large projector screens on the side of them, first by taking down oncoming waves of flying soldiers in midair combat and later the soldiers inside the interior, taking out the elite captain for a key and self-destructing the aircraft with it. In some stages, Hardboiled can encounter other bird allies involved in the resistance throughout the game. Cardinals assist Hardboiled through using either melee combat or shotguns, and protesting budgie civilians must be escorted to safety to activate switches or open doors. These budgies carry signs that can also be found in certain parts of the map through juggling enemies into specific spots or searching through hidden or dark areas.

In the co-op campaign, two players can complete the missions together as Budgie Commandos. Each of the six playable budgies (eight counting the DLC characters) all use only one weapon of a different type. The maps and controls are almost the same as in the regular campaign, except the puzzles have to be solved in different ways as the characters are smaller and both players have to help each other to be able to progress. In this mode, players can stack on-top of each other, both being able to fire left and right simultaneously when stacked. The goal of this mode is to find a hostage that needs to be taken back to the general's base. Players are dropped off in the same forest as in the single player mode and go through most of the stages, though they are both unable to enter jetpack stages, and the game ends at the launching base for the rocket instead of inside the rocket.

Plot
Rocketbirds''' single player campaign opens with Hardboiled Chicken fighting a barrage of Penguin army soldiers. His mission is to find and kill the corrupt Penguin dictator, iL Putzki, in order to set the citizens of Albatropolis free. Hardboiled's jetpack runs low on fuel during his flight, dropping him into the woods where a nearby building is being guarded by penguins. Elsewhere, Putzki himself finds out about Hardboiled's whereabouts, going into a panic until Brno Albatross, Putzki's bodyguard, ensures him that Hardboiled is only a one-man army fighting against millions. Hardboiled soon enters the building, later getting himself trapped in a cell where he is then tortured by Brno. It is then revealed through a series of flashbacks that Hardboiled, alongside various others, had been initially captured at a young age and forced to serve for the Penguin army, after a failed attempt to cook him at birth led to him still being alive years later. The army's black star symbol was imprinted onto his head during training, where he was made to obey the dictatorial rules set by the Penguins. Hardboiled's reasoning for rebelling is implied in the third of these flashbacks, where during his time serving under Putzki, an adult Hardboiled spotted a younger chicken from Albatropolis who looked very similar to himself when he was young. This caused him to regain some sense of humanity and immediately turn against his own fleet, first by attacking one of his former colleagues after seeing the child being threatened with death if Hardboiled didn't follow orders. Having been rescued afterwards, the young chicken gave Hardboiled a grey bandana to cover the black star on his forehead.

After the torture flashback, Hardboiled wakes up in another cell with a cardinal standing next to him. He is then provided with a box of brain bugs to trick the prison guards into letting both them and the other captives free. On his way out of the facility, Hardboiled encounters Brno fleeing with Putzki to go on a rocket ship departing into space. Hardboiled eventually reaches the rocket with his jetpack, provided by a cardinal finding it and giving it to him on his way out, where he is soon ambushed by Brno from behind a nearby door. Hardboiled eventually kills Brno, and he soon gives chase to Putzki on a series of elevators. At the end of the game, Hardboiled corners and possesses Putzki with a brain bug and forces him to walk into the vacuum of space without a suit, causing his head to explode and ultimately killing Putzki. The final cutscene reveals three Cosmic Owls finding Putzki's fez in space and Brno's corpse in the rocket where Hardboiled fought him in, setting up events for the sequel.

In the co-op campaign, the main mission is to rescue the general's daughter (later named Pinky in Rocketbirds 2) and bring her back alive from the hands of the G-Men, who are geese that look similar to Brno. Every time she's found however, she runs off elsewhere and leaves the player characters confused. This persists until the final stage in the campaign, where the now annoyed Budgie Commandos wrap her near the end of their escape rope as they head back into the rescue helicopter, flying her back home with them.

Development
In 2000, Sian Yue Tan and James Anderson made the Flash animation Albatropolis: 'Pilot'. A parody of an 80s trend started by Teenage Mutant Ninja Turtles, the video featured chickens and penguins violently fighting against each other in a snowy field. The concept stuck around with Yu Tan for a while until he formed Ratloop Asia the same year, using the characters as a way of practicing game development. Nine years later, Rocketbirds: Revolution! was launched online in 2009 as a browser-based game, with a free playable demo for the first chapter and the remaining ten being paid for as long as the player had an account. This early version was later nominated for three awards in the 2010 Independent Games Festival for Excellence in Audio, Excellence in Visual Art and the Seumas McNally Grand Prize, losing out only to Closure, Limbo and Monaco in each category respectively.

Ratloop would eventually make a deal with Sony Computer Entertainment to have the game be an exclusive for the PlayStation 3 and PlayStation Vita, with PC ports releasing two years afterwards. These versions added the co-op story mode, jetpack stages, more cutscenes and miscellaneous visual improvements to the initial Flash version. The Vita version in particular featured different stage layouts and added short tutorial cutscenes, along with a teaser for the then-in-development Rocketbirds 2 that showcased early concept art. Some of these included concepts of tanks and Hardboiled riding a motorcycle, both of which never got implemented into the released game.

Reception

The PlayStation Vita version received "generally favorable reviews", while the PC and PlayStation 3 versions received above-average reviews, according to the review aggregation website Metacritic.

Sequel
A sequel titled Rocketbirds 2: Evolution'' was released in 2016. The game featured various changes in controls and graphics to allow for a faster-paced experience. Hardboiled and the other playable characters can now double jump, aim in various directions, and use melee combat. The cooperative Rescue mode, released as free DLC, also gave players the opportunity to play as Hardboiled alongside the Budgie Commandos after unlocking him in the story campaign.

References

External links
 Developer Ratloop website
 

2011 video games
Cooperative video games
Fictional chickens
Linux games
MacOS games
Multiplayer and single-player video games
PhyreEngine games
Platform games
PlayStation 3 games
PlayStation 4 games
PlayStation Network games
PlayStation Vita games
Ratloop games
Strategy video games
Video games about birds
Video games developed in the United States
Windows games